The Libby Creek is a  stream on the eastern slopes of the Snowy Range in southern Wyoming. Libby Creek starts as it flows out of Libby Lake and flows violently down the east side of the Snowies until it empties into the North Fork of the Little Laramie.

See also
List of Wyoming rivers

References

External links

Rivers of Wyoming
Rivers of Albany County, Wyoming